Pseudimbrasia is a monotypic moth genus in the family Saturniidae described by Pierre Claude Rougeot in 1962. Its only species, Pseudimbrasia deyrollei, described by James Thomson in 1858, is found in the mid-latitudes of Africa.

References

External links
 

Moths described in 1858
Monotypic moth genera
Saturniinae
Moths of Sub-Saharan Africa
Lepidoptera of Cameroon
Lepidoptera of West Africa
Lepidoptera of Uganda
Lepidoptera of Mozambique
Lepidoptera of Angola
Insects of Chad
Lepidoptera of the Republic of the Congo
Lepidoptera of Gabon
Lepidoptera of Malawi
Lepidoptera of Tanzania
Lepidoptera of Zambia
Lepidoptera of Zimbabwe